This is a list of public libraries in Ontario.

Background

Ontario public libraries are created by municipal by-laws and governed by public library boards. The Ontario Ministry of Tourism and Culture has responsibility for the administration of the Public Libraries Act. The ministry's Culture Services Unit provides support for the public library system and the Ontario Library Service deliver programs on behalf of the ministry.

TOC

A
 Addington Highlands Public Libraries
 Admaston / Bromley Public Library
 Ajax Public Library
 Alderville First Nation Library
 Alfred-Plantagenet Township Public Library
 Algonquins of Pikwakanagan Public Library
 Alnwick / Haldimand Public Library
 Anishinabe of Wauzhushk First Nation
 Armstrong Township Public Library
 Arnprior Public Library
 Asphodel-Norwood Township Public Library
 Assiginack Public Library
 Athens Township Public Library
 Atikokan Public Library
 Augusta Public Library
 Aurora Public Library

B
 Bancroft Public Library
 Barrie Public Library
 Barry's Bay & Area Public Library
 Beausoleil First Nation Public Library
 Belleville Public Library
 Big Grassy First Nation Public Library
 Bkejwanong First Nation Community Library
 Black River / Matheson Public Library
 Blind River Public Library
 Blue Mountains Public Library
 Bonfield Public Library
 Bonnechere Union Public Library
 Bracebridge Public Library
 Brampton Library
 Bradford West Gwillimbury Public Library
 Brant Public Library
 Brighton Public Library
 Brock Township Public Libraries
 Brockville Public Library
 Bruce County Public Library
 Burk's Falls, Armour & Ryerson Union Public Library
 Burlington Public Library

C
 Caldwell First Nation Public Library
 Caledon Public Library
 Callander Public Library
 Cambridge Public Library (Ontario)
 Carleton Place Public Library
 Carlow-Mayo Public Library
 Casselman Public Library
 Cavan Monaghan Library
 Central Manitoulin Public Library
 Champlain Township Public Library
 Chapleau Public Library
 Chatham-Kent Public Library
 Chippewas of Georgina Island First Nation Library
 Chippewas of Kettle and Stony Point First Nation Public Library
 Chippewas of the Thames First Nation Library & Resource Center 1
 Clarington Public Library
 Clarence-Rockland Public Library
 Clearview Public Library
 Cobalt Public Library
 Cobourg Public Library
 Collingwood Public Library
 Conmee Public Library
 Cornwall Public Library
 Cramahe Township Public Library
 Curve Lake First Nation Public Library

D
 Deep River: W.B. Lewis Public Library
 Delaware Nation Public Library
 Deseronto Public Library
 Dorion Public Library
 Douro-Dummer Public Library
 Dryden Public Library

E
 Ear Falls Public Library
 East Ferris Public Library
 East Gwillimbury Public Library
 Edwardsburgh / Cardinal Public Library
 Elgin County Public Library
 Elizabethtown - Kitley Township Public Library
 Elliot Lake Public Library
 Englehart Public Library
 Essa Township Public Library
 Essex County Library

F
 Fort Erie Public Library
 Fort Frances Public Library
 Front of Yonge Public Library

G
 Galway-Cavendish & Harvey Township Public Library
 Gananoque Public Library
 Georgian Bay (Township of) Public Library
 Georgina Public Libraries
 Grand Valley Public Library
 Gravenhurst Public Library
 Greater Madawaska Public Library
 Greater Sudbury Public Library
 Grey Highlands Public Library
 Grimsby Public Library
 Guelph Public Library

H
 Haliburton County Public Library
 Haldimand County Public Libraries
 Halton Hills Public Library
 Hamilton Public Library
 Hanover Public Library
 Hastings Highlands Public Library
 Havelock-Belmont-Methuen (Township of) Public Library
 Hawkesbury Public Library
 Head, Clara & Maria Township Public Library
 Huntsville Public Library
 Huron County Library

I
 Innisfil Public Library

J
 John Dixon Public Library

K
 Kanhiote Tyendinaga Territory Public Library
 Kawartha Lakes Public Library
 Kenora Public Library
 Killaloe Public Library
 King Township Public Library
 Kingston Frontenac Public Library
 Kitchener Public Library

L
 La Nation Public Library
 Lake of Bays Public Library
 Lambton County Library
 Lanark Highlands Public Library
 Laurentian Hills Public Library
 Leeds & The Thousand Islands Public Library
 Lennox & Addington County Information Services
 Lincoln Public Library
 London Public Library

M
 Madoc Public Library
 Magnetawan Public Library
 Marmora and Lake Public Library
 Manitouwadge Public Library
 Markham Public Library
 McKellar Public Library
 Meaford Public Library
 Merrickville Public Library
 Michipicoten Township Public Library
 Middlesex County Library
 Midland Public Library
 Milton Public Library
 Mississauga Library System
 Mississaugas of the New Credit First Nation Library
 Mississippi Mills Public Library
 Mnjikaning First Nation Public Library
 Muskoka Lakes Township Public Libraries

N
 New Tecumseth Public Library
 Newmarket Public Library
 Niagara Falls Public Library
 Niagara-on-the-Lake Public Library
 Ninda-kiKaendjigae-Wigammik First Nation Public Library
 Nipigon Public Library
 Norfolk County Public Library
 North Bay Public Library
 North Grenville Public Library
 North Himsworth Public Library
 North Kawartha Public Library
 North Perth Public Library

O
 Oakville Public Library
 Oliver Paipoonge Public Library
 Oneida Community Library
 Orangeville Public Library
 Orillia Public Library
 Oshawa Public Library
 Oxford County Public Library
 Otonabee-South Monaghan Township Public Library
 Ottawa Public Library
 Owen Sound & North Grey Union Public Library

P
 Parry Sound Public Library
 Pelham Public Library
 Pelee Island Public Library
 Pembroke Public Library
 Penetanguishene Public Library
 Perth East Public Library
 Perth and District Union Public Library
 Petawawa Public Library
 Peterborough Public Library
 Pickering Public Library
 Port Colborne Public Library
 Port Hope Public Library
 Powassan & District Union Public Library
 Prescott Public Library
 Prince Edward County Public Library

Q
 Quinte West Public Library

R
 Ramara Township Public Library
 Red Rock Public Library
 Region of Waterloo Library
 Renfrew Public Library
 Richmond Hill Public Library
 Rideau Lakes Union Public Library
 Russell Township Public Library

S
 Saugeen First Nation Public Library
 Sault Ste. Marie Public Library
 Schreiber Public Library
 Scugog Memorial Public Library
 Selwyn Public Library
 Severn Township Public Library
 Shelburne Public Library
 Sioux Lookout Public Library
 Simcoe Library Cooperative
 Six Nations Public Library
 Smiths Falls Public Library
 Springwater Township Public Library
 St. Catharines Public Library
 St. Marys Public Library
 St. Thomas Public Library
 Stirling-Rawdon Public Library
 Stormont, Dundas & Glengarry County Library
 Stratford Public Library

T
 Tay Public Library
 Teck Centennial Public Library
 Temagami Public Library
 Temiskaming Shores Public Library
 Terrace Bay Public Library
 Thorold Public Library
 Thunder Bay Public Library
 Timmins Public Library
 Toronto Public Library
 Trent Hills Public Library
 Tudor & Cashel Township Public Library
 Tweed Public Library
 Tyendinaga Township Public Library

U
 Uxbridge Public Library

V
 Vaughan Public Libraries

W
 Wahta Mohawks Library
 Wainfleet Township Public Library
 Wasaga Beach Public Library
 Waterloo Public Library
 Welland Public Library
 Wellington County Public Library
 West Grey Public Library
 West Lincoln Public Library
 West Nipissing Public Library
 West Perth Public Library
 Whitby Public Library
 Whitchurch-Stouffville Public Library
 White River Public Library
 Whitewater Region Public Library
 Windsor Public Library
 Woodstock Public Library

See also

 Library and Archives Canada
 List of libraries
 List of national and state libraries
 List of archives

References

External links
Archives of Ontario
Ontario > Ministry of Tourism, Culture, and Sport > Public Libraries
Ontario Library Association (Ontario public libraries, by region)
Ontario Library Service
The Federation of Ontario Public Libraries

Ontario
Libraries